is a Japanese manga series by Kei Ohkubo. It has been serialized in Tokuma Shoten's seinen manga magazine Monthly Comic Zenon since October 2013. It has been collected in seventeen tankōbon volumes. The manga is licensed in North America by Comikey. An anime television series adaptation by Seven Arcs aired from April to June 2020.

Plot
In early 16th-century Florence, Italy, Arte is the only daughter of the noble but decadent Spalletti household. Since her childhood, Arte has proved herself blessed with an unusual talent for painting, but when her father dies, her mother tries to force her to abandon her love for art and find a noble young man to marry as soon as possible in order to save the Spallettis from ruin.

Arte, however, refuses to give up her dreams, and, going against the beliefs of her time, she starts searching for a master painter to work for, hoping to one day become a master painter herself.

Her strong determination ultimately catches the attention of the young but well-known painter Leo, who finally accepts her as his apprentice. Unfortunately, as times goes on, Arte finds herself falling in love with her mentor Leo, and is forced to make her choice between her personal artistic dream and realistic love.

Characters

The heiress of the noble Spalletti household of Florence. Since childhood, she was blessed with a deep love and talent for painting. To allow his daughter to satisfy her passion, her father provided her with the best teachers, but after his death, her mother forces her to give up her dream of becoming a master painter and get married as soon as possible to save their penniless family. Determined to protect her dreams at all costs, Arte ultimately leaves her house and her noble status behind and goes in search of a master to become an apprentice of, defying all the moral codes of her time.

A young painter with an unhappy childhood and a past as a beggar, he accepts after many hesitations to take Arte as his apprentice, above all because in her he sees himself when he had decided to pursue his vocation at the expense of his humble origins. 

A young sculptor apprentice, he comes from a relatively wealthy family but was forced to work to help his father, magistrate of the Lordship, put aside the money necessary to pay the dowry of his five sisters. He falls in love with Arte at first sight.

 Rich, beautiful and a pragmatic courtesan, she is the most desired woman in Florence, with an endless crowd of admirers and clients. She takes a liking to Arte from their first meeting, to the point of commissioning her portrait, which then becomes the debut work of the young painter. 

Venetian nobleman and skilled merchant from the noble house Falier (ファリエル), he accidentally gets to know Arte after visiting Veronica during a visit to Florence. Bewitched by the talent and decisive character of Arte, he proposes that she go to Venice to become both the family painter and the tutor of his niece.

The eldest daughter of Malta and Sofia dei Falier (ソフィア Sofia), a family of noble merchants and among the oldest in Venice. Arte is summoned to Venice to be her etiquette tutor. 

 A seamstress and the daughter of a farmer. She has been sewing expertly since she was a child. Previously, she was jealous of the aristocracy of which Arte was a part, but she was impressed by her hard work and learned how to read and write with Arte teaching her.

Media

Manga
Arte is written and illustrated by Kei Ohkubo. It began serialization in Tokuma Shoten's Monthly Comic Zenon magazine on October 25, 2013. As of November 2022, seventeen tankōbon volumes have been published. The manga was formerly licensed in North America by Media Do, but is now licensed by digital manga publisher Comikey.

Anime
An anime television series adaptation was announced by Tokuma Shoten on July 19, 2019. The series was animated by Seven Arcs and directed by Takayuki Hamana, with Reiko Yoshida handling series composition and Chieko Miyakawa designing the characters. Gorō Itō composed the series' music. It aired from April 4 to June 20, 2020 on Tokyo MX, BS Fuji, and ytv. Maaya Sakamoto performed the opening theme song "Clover", while Kiyono Yasuno performed the ending theme song "Hare Moyō".

On April 3, 2020, Funimation announced that they licensed the series for streaming in the U.S., Canada, the UK, and Ireland. On October 9, 2020, Funimation announced that the series would receive an English dub, which premiered the following day.

Notes

References

External links
Arte  at Monthly Comic Zenon 
 

Anime series based on manga
Art in anime and manga
Comics set in the 16th century
Comics set in Florence
Crunchyroll anime
Fictional painters
Historical anime and manga
Italy in fiction
Seinen manga
Seven Arcs
Tokuma Shoten manga
Tokyo MX original programming